Peter Clarke is an Australian former professional rugby league footballer who played in the 1990s.

Playing career
Clarke made his first grade debut for Manly in Round 22 of the 1993 season against Western Suburbs. In 1995, Clarke joined Eastern Suburbs later renamed as the Sydney Roosters and enjoyed his best period in first grade. In 1996, Clarke played 24 games for the club as they reached the finals for the first time in a number of years.  In 1998, Clarke joined the ill-fated Adelaide Rams and was a member of their last ever game a 34-20 loss against the Newcastle Knights. After the liquidation of Adelaide, Clarke joined South Sydney and ironically was involved in their final ever match as a first grade side which was a 34-16 loss to Parramatta. Souths were later readmitted to the competition in 2002 but this would prove to be Clarke's last ever game in first grade.  Clarke played with Souths while they were excluded from the competition featuring in promotional games that were aimed at awareness and to gain support for a push to readmit Souths into the NRL.

References

1974 births
Living people
Adelaide Rams players
Australian rugby league players
Manly Warringah Sea Eagles players
Rugby league centres
Rugby league players from Sydney
South Sydney Rabbitohs players
Sydney Roosters players